Magiriopsis is a monotypic snout moth genus described by Carl Heinrich in 1956. Its only species, Magiriopsis denticosella, was described by Harrison Gray Dyar Jr. in 1912, as a species of Sematoneura, but was reassigned to Magiriopsis by Heinrich in 1956. It is found in Mexico.

References

Pyralidae genera
Phycitinae
Monotypic moth genera
Moths of Central America
Taxa named by Carl Heinrich